The GM-X Stiletto was a dream car created by General Motors in 1964. It was designed to have an aerospace design, aircraft steering, a maintenance monitoring system, toggle switch controls, and three way communication speakers. The instrument cluster featured 30 flashing lights, 29 controls and 16 gauges. You entered the car by folding the roof and the rear section up. It was not designed to be driven and was just an empty shell, but the rear section was used in a more modest form in the 1967 Cadillac Eldorado. It shares an appearance with the Buick Century Cruiser.

References

External links
 GM Photo Store

X Stiletto